The Kingdom of Benin, also known as the Edo Kingdom, or the Benin Empire (Bini: Arriọba ẹdo) was a kingdom within what is now southern Nigeria. It has no historical relation to the modern republic of Benin, which was known as Dahomey from the 17th century until 1975. The Kingdom of Benin's capital was Edo, now known as Benin City in Edo State, Nigeria. The Benin Kingdom was "one of the oldest and most developed states in the coastal hinterland of West Africa". It grew out of the previous Edo Kingdom of Igodomigodo around the 11th century AD, and lasted until it was annexed by the British Empire in 1897.

Oral traditions

The original people and founders of the Benin Kingdom, the Edo people, were initially ruled by the Ogiso (Kings of the Sky) who called their land Igodomigodo. The first Ogiso (Ogiso Igodo), wielded much influence and gained popularity as a good ruler. He died after a long reign and was succeeded by Ere, his eldest son. In the 12th century, a great palace intrigue erupted and crown prince Ekaladerhan, the only son of the last Ogiso, was sentenced to death as a result of the first queen (who was barren) changing an oracle's message to the Ogiso. In carrying out the royal order, that he be killed, the palace messengers had mercy and set the prince free at Ughoton near Benin. When his father the Ogiso died, the Ogiso dynasty  ended. The people and royal kingmakers preferred their late king's son as the next to rule.

The exiled Prince Ekaladerhan had by this time changed his name to Izoduwa (meaning 'I have chosen the path of prosperity') and found his way to Uhe (Ile-Ife). It was during this period of confusion in Benin that the elders, led by Chief Oliha, mounted a search for the banished Prince Ekaladerhan – whom the Ile-Ife people now called Oduduwa. Oduduwa, who could not return due to his advanced age, granted them Oranmiyan to his grandson, to rule over them. Oranmiyan meaning "My case is settled or my trouble is over or I chose trouble" in the Yoruba language. Oranmiyan was resisted by Ogiamien Irebor, one of the palace chiefs, and took up his abode in the palace built for him at Usama by the elders (now a coronation shrine). Soon after his arrival, he married a beautiful lady, Erinmwinde, daughter of Ogie-Egor, the ninth Enogie of Egor, by whom he had a son.

After residing there for some years he called a meeting of the people and renounced his office, remarking in vexation Ile-Ibinu in Yoruba language ("ile" means land, "ubinu" mean anger), and thus the kingdom was called Ubinu in Ife tongue, which was mispronounced Bini in the 15th and 16th centuries by the Portuguese). This was out of frustration as he often expressed that "only a child born, trained and educated in the arts and mysteries of the land could reign over the people". He arranged for his son born to him by Erinmwinde, Eweka, to be made king in his place, and returned to Yorubaland thereafter. His son the new king was soon found to be deaf and mute, and so the elders appealed to Oranmiyan. He gave them charmed seeds known as "omo ayo"(The seed of the Ayo game found in Yorubaland) to play with, saying that to do so will make him talk. The little Eweka played with the seeds with his peers at Useh near egor, his mother's hometown. While playing with the seeds, he announced "Owomika"(My hand has grasped it!) in the Yoruba language, which became his royal name. Thus, he gave rise to the tradition of the subsequent Obas of Benin spending seven days and nights at Usama before proceeding to announce their royal names at Useh. Eweka thus started a dynasty that now bears his name. Oranmiyan went on to serve as the founder of the Oyo Empire, where he ruled as the first Alaafin of Oyo. He then returned to Ile-Ife where he was the king of Ife until he shape shifted or practised Therianthropy and entered the earth with his horse. His descendants now rule in Ile Ife, Oyo and Benin to this day.

Aside from Benin City, the system of rule of the Oba in the empire, even through the golden age of the kingdom, was still loosely based upon the Ogiso dynasty's tradition, which was military protection in exchange for pledged allegiance and taxes paid to the royal administrative centre. The language and culture was not enforced, as the empire remained heterogeneous and localized according to each group within the kingdom, though a local enogie (or duke) was often appointed by the Oba for specific ethnic areas.

Prehistory
By the 1st century BC, the Benin territory was partially agricultural; and it became primarily agricultural by around 500 AD, but hunting and gathering still remained important. Also by 500, iron was in use by the inhabitants of the Benin territory.

Benin City (formerly Edo) sprang up by around 1000, in a forest that could be easily defended. The dense vegetation and narrow paths made the city easy to defend against attacks. The rainforest, which Benin City is situated in, helped in the development of the city because of its vast resources – fish from rivers and creeks, animals to hunt, leaves for roofing, plants for medicine, ivory for carving and trading, and wood for boat building – that could be exploited. However, domesticated animals, from the forest and surrounding areas, could not survive, due to a disease spread by tsetse flies; after centuries of exposure, some animals, such as cattle and goats, developed a resistance to the disease.

The original name of the kingdom of Benin, at its creation some time in the first millennium CE, was Igodomigodo, as its inhabitants called it. Their ruler was called Ogiso – the ruler of the sky. Nearly 36 known Ogiso are accounted for as rulers of this initial incarnation of the state.

History 
A series of walls marked the incremental growth of the city from 850 AD until its decline in the 16th century. This was excavated in the early 1960s by Graham Connah. Connah estimated that its construction if spread out over five dry seasons, would have required a workforce of 1,000 laborers working ten hours a day, seven days a week. Ewuare also added great thoroughfares and erected nine fortified gateways. Excavations at Benin City have revealed that it was already flourishing around 1200–1300 CE.

In 1440, Oba Ewuare, also known as Ewuare the Great, came to power and expanded the borders of the former city-state. It was only at this time that the administrative centre of the kingdom began to be referred to as Ubinu after the Portuguese word and corrupted to Bini by the Itsekhiri, Urhobo and Edo who all lived together in the royal administrative centre of the kingdom. The Oba had become the mount of power within the region. In the 15th century, Oba Ewuare is credited with turning Benin City into a city-state from a military fortress built by the Ogisos, protected by moats and walls. It was from this bastion that he launched his military campaigns and began the expansion of the kingdom from the Edo-speaking heartlands. These were apparently raised to mark out territories for towns and cities. Thirteen years after Ewuare's death, tales of Benin's splendors lured more Portuguese traders to the city gates.

In the early 16th century, Oba Esigie expanded the kingdom eastwards, taking land from the Kingdom of Ife. Benin gained political strength and ascendancy over much of what is now mid-western Nigeria. Its wealth grew through its extensive trade, especially with the Portuguese. European traders were keen to acquire ivory, pepper and slaves that Benin had taken captive in wars. During the late 16th century, Oba Ehengbuda was the last of the warrior kings, when he died in 1601, the empire gradually shrank in size.

In the 17th century, the kingdom declined following several civil wars and disputes, with the seven obas during this period wasting the kingdom's riches. However, the early 18th century saw a revival where Oba Ewuakpe restored the authority of the oba position and the fortunes of the kingdom. His son, Oba Akenzua benefited from trade with Europeans and was to be one of the richest obas in the kingdom's history.

The state developed an advanced artistic culture, especially in its famous artifacts of bronze, iron and ivory. These include bronze wall plaques and life-sized bronze heads depicting the Obas and Iyobas of Benin. These plaques also included other human and animal figures as well as items like ceremonial belts. Ivory was also used, as seen in the carving of ivory into ornate boxes, combs and armlets. The most well-known artifact is based on Queen Idia, now known as the Benin ivory mask. Ivory masks were meant to be worn around the waist of kings.

Benin ruled over the tribes of the Niger Delta including the Western Igbo, Ijaw, Itshekiri, Ika, Isoko and Urhobo amongst others. It also held sway over the Eastern Yoruba tribes of Ondo, Ekiti, Mahin/Ugbo, and Ijebu. At its height in the 16th century, Benin dominated trade along the entire coastline from the Western Niger Delta, through Lagos reaching almost Accra in the West. Benin's power declined from the late 16th century as it lost control over territories in the west. (It was for this reason that this coastline was named the Bight of Benin. The present-day Republic of Benin, formerly Dahomey, decided to choose the name of this bight as the name of its country).

Britain seeks control over trade
Benin temporarily declined after 1700 after a civil war, then partially recovered later in that century, only to decline once again in the late 19th century. Benin's economy was previously thriving in the early to mid 19th century with the development of the trade in palm oil, and the continuation of the trade in textiles, ivory and other resources. To preserve the kingdom's independence, the Oba gradually banned the export of goods from Benin, until the trade was exclusively in palm oil.

By the latter half of the 19th century, Britain preferred a closer relationship with the Kingdom of Benin; as British officials were increasingly interested in controlling trade in the area and in accessing the kingdom's palm oil, kola nut, ivory and potentially rubber resources, following the introduction of Hevea brasiliensis saplings, via Kew Gardens in 1895.

Several attempts were made to achieve this end beginning with the official visit of Richard Francis Burton in 1862 when he was consul at Fernando Pó. Following that came attempts to establish a treaty between Benin and the United Kingdom by Hewtt, Blair and Annesley in 1884, 1885 and 1886 respectively. However, these efforts did not yield any results. The kingdom resisted becoming a British protectorate throughout the 1880s, but the British remained persistent. Progress was made 1892 during the visit of Vice-Consul Henry Gallwey. This mission was the first official visit after Burton's. Moreover, it would also set in motion the events to come that would lead to Oba Ovonramwen's fall from power.

The Gallwey Treaty of 1892

In the late 19th century, the Kingdom of Benin managed to retain its independence and the Oba exercised a monopoly over trade which British merchants in the region found irksome. The territory was coveted by an influential group of investors for its rich natural resources such as palm-oil, and ivory. After British consul Richard Burton visited Benin in 1862 he wrote of Benin's as a place of "gratuitous barbarity which stinks of death", a narrative which was publicized in Britain and increased support for the territory's colonization. In spite of this, the kingdom maintained its independence and was not visited by another representative of Britain until 1892 when Henry Gallwey, the British Vice-Consul of the Oil Rivers Protectorate (later the Niger Coast Protectorate), visited Benin City hoping to open up trade and ultimately annex Benin Kingdom and transform it into a British protectorate.  Gallwey was able to get Omo n’Oba (Ovonramwen) and his chiefs to sign a treaty which gave Britain legal justification for exerting greater influence over the Empire. While the treaty itself contains text suggesting Ovonramwen sought Benin to become a protectorate, this was contrasted by Gallwey's own account, which suggests the Oba was hesitant to sign the treaty. Although some suggest that humanitarian motivations were driving Britain's actions, letters written between colonial administrators suggest that economic motivations were predominant. The treaty itself does not explicitly mention anything about Benin's "bloody customs" that Burton had written about, and instead only includes a vague clause about ensuring "the general progress of civilization".

The Massacre of 1897

A British delegation departed from the Oil Rivers Protectorate in 1897 with the stated aim of negotiating with the Oba of Benin. The leader of the delegation, James Robert Phillips, had asked his superiors in the British Foreign Office for permission to lead an armed British expedition to depose the Oba of Benin not long before the expedition, but left for Benin City with a diplomatic delegation (or a reconnaissance mission disguised as a peaceful diplomatic delegation) before receiving a reply to his request. Perceiving this to be an attempt to depose the Oba, the Oba's generals unilaterally ordered an attack on the delegation as it was approaching Benin City (which included eight unknowing British representatives and hundreds of African porters and labourers) all but two of whom were killed. A punitive expedition was launched in response, and a 1,200-men strong force, under the command of Sir Harry Rawson, captured Benin City. They deliberately sought out and destroyed certain areas of the city, including those thought to belong to the chiefs responsible for the ambush of the British delegation, and in the process a fire burnt the palace and surrounding quarters, which the British claimed was accidental.

There has much debate of why James Phillips set out on the mission to Benin without much weaponry. Some have argued he was going on a peaceful mission. Such commentators argue that the message from the Oba that his festival would not permit him to receive European visitors touched the humanitarian side of Phillips's character because of an incorrect assumption that the festival included human sacrifice. According to Igbafe, this does not explain why Phillips set out before he had received a reply from the Foreign Office to his request where he stated that: F.O. 2/I02, Phillips to F.O. no. 105 of i6 Nov 1896. Phillips wrote that 'there is nothing in the shape of a standing army. ... and the inhabitants appear to be if not a peace-loving at any rate a most unwarlike people whose only exploits during many generations had been an occasional quarrel with their neighbours about trade or slave raiding and it appears at least improbable that they have any arms to speak of except the usual number of trade guns... When Captain Gallwey visited the city the only canon he saw were half a dozen old Portuguese guns. They were lying on the grass unmounted'. Compare this with the opinion of his immediate predecessor, Ralph Moor, who was convinced that 'the people in all the villages are no doubt possessed of arms' (F.O. 2/84, Moor to F.O. no. 39 of I2 Sept. 1895).

Igbafe also points to Phillips' November 1896 advocacy of military force regarding Benin, arguing that this is inconsistent with the perception of Phillips as a man of peace in January 1897. Igbafe posits that Phillips was going on a reconnaissance mission and that Phillips' haste to Benin can be explained by a belief that nothing bad would happen to him or his party.

The expeditionary force also looted the palace art. The looted portrait figures, busts, and groups created in iron, carved ivory, and especially in brass (conventionally termed the "Benin Bronzes") were sold off to defray the cost of the expedition and some were accessioned to the British Museum; most were sold elsewhere and are now on display in various museums around the world. In March 2021, institutions in Berlin, Germany and Aberdeen, Scotland announced decisions to return Benin Bronzes in their possession to their place of origin.

The British occupied Benin, which was absorbed into the British Niger Coast Protectorate and eventually into British colonial Nigeria. A general emancipation of slaves followed in the wake of British occupation but Britain also imposed a system of forced labour in Benin and in surrounding areas, as they did throughout other parts of southern Nigeria. The British launched an additional operation in 1899, called the "Benin Territories Expedition", against rebels still holding out against the British. The British burnt down numerous towns, and destroyed farms in an attempt to starve the rebels into submission. After the 1899 expedition, military resistance in the former Kingdom of Benin against the British occupation ceased

Notable figures 

Below are several notable figures of the Kingdom of Benin
 Queen Idia was the wife of Oba Ozolua, the Oba who reigned in about 1481 AD. She was a famous warrior who received much of the credit for the victories of her son as his political counsel, together with her mystical powers and medicinal knowledge, were viewed as critical elements of Esigie's success on the battlefield. Queen Idia became more popular when an ivory carving of her face was adopted as the symbol of FESTAC in 1977.
Emotan was trader who sold her wares at the exact point where her statue now stands. She was historically credited with setting up the first primary school in the kingdom and saving the monarchy during one of its lowest moments. She helped the Oba Ewuare in reclaiming the throne from his usurper brother, Oba Uwaifiokun who reigned about 1432 AD.
Queen Iden is yet another heroine whose sacrifice helped shape Benin Kingdom. She was the queen during the reign of Oba Ewuape in about 1700 AD. She is known to have volunteered herself as a sacrificial lamb for the welfare of her husband and that of the entire kingdom after she consulted the oracle and was informed that human sacrifice would be needed to appease the gods and restore peace and unity in the kingdom.
General Asoro the Warrior was the sword bearer to King Oronramwen (the Oba of Benin) in 1897. He participated in the defence of Benin during the 1897 expedition, engaging the British expeditionary force sent to capture the Oba. A quote uttered by the general that "no other person [should] dare pass this road except the Oba" (So kpon Oba) was later translated to "SAKPONBA", which a well known road in Benin was named after.
Chief Obasogie was not just an outstanding Benin warrior of old who defended the kingdom against external invasion but also a talented blacksmith and sculptor.

Rituals and law

Human sacrifice
Forty-one female skeletons thrown into a pit were discovered by the archaeologist Graham Connah. These findings indicate that human sacrifice or execution of criminals took place in Benin in the thirteenth century AD. From the early days, human sacrifices were a part of the state religion. But many of the accounts of the sacrifices, says historian J. D. Graham, are exaggerated or based on rumour and speculation. He says that all of the evidence "points to a limited, ritual custom of human sacrifice, many of the written accounts referring to the human sacrifices describe them as actually being executed criminals".

Edo historian Professor Philip Igbafe states that in pre-colonial Benin, the tradition was that only slaves could be sacrificed. This could include hardened criminals and those who had committed serious crimes, who would either be executed or sold into slavery. Sacrifices were made at the anniversary of the Oba's father, at the annual bead ceremony, and to propitiate the gods when poor weather threatened crops or when an epidemic threatened. In addition, the threat of a major calamity or national disaster was also an occasion for sacrifices.

Humans were sacrificed in an annual ritual in honour of the god of iron, where warriors from Benin City would perform an acrobatic dance while suspended from the trees. The ritual recalled a mythical war against the sky.

Sacrifices of a man, a woman, a goat, a cow and a ram were also made to a god called "the king of death". The god, named Ogiuwu, was worshipped at a special altar in the centre of Benin City.

There were two separate annual series of rites that honored past Obas. Sacrifices were performed every fifth day. At the end of each series of rites, the current Oba's deceased father was honored with a public festival. During the festival, twelve criminals, chosen from a prison where the worst criminals were held, were sacrificed.

By the end of the eighteenth century, three to four people were sacrificed at the mouth of the Benin River annually, to attract European trade, according to one source.

Burials 
The monarchy of Benin was hereditary; the eldest son was to become the new Oba. In order to validate the succession of the kingship, the eldest son had to bury his father and perform elaborate rituals. If the eldest son failed to complete these tasks, the eldest son might be disqualified from becoming king.

Separation of son and mother 
After the son was installed as king, his mother – after having been invested with the title of Iyoba – was transferred to a palace just outside Benin City, in a place called Uselu. The mother held a considerable amount of power; she was, however, never allowed to meet her son – who was now a divine ruler – again.

Divinity of the Oba
In Benin, the Oba was seen as divine. The Oba's divinity and sacredness was the focal point of the kingship. The Oba was shrouded in mystery; he only left his palace on ceremonial occasions. It was previously punishable by death to assert that the Oba performed human acts, such as eating, sleeping, dying or washing. The Oba was also credited with having magical powers.

Architecture 

The Impluvium was used in Benin architecture to store rainwater. Among the residences of the nobility, a compluvium channeled the rainwater into the impluvium in order to permit light and air through the walls since windows were absent among these structures. The stored rainwater in the impluvium was discharged out of the house through a drainage system beneath the floor. Archaeological works from the mid 20th century has revealed the existence of edge-laid potsherd pavements in Benin city, dated around or prior to the 14th century. The Walls of Benin are a series of earthworks made up of banks and ditches, called ya in the Edo language in the area around present-day Benin City, the capital of present-day Edo, Nigeria. Some estimates suggest that the walls of Benin may have been constructed between the thirteenth and mid-fifteenth century CE and others suggest that the walls of Benin (in the Esan region) may have been constructed during the first millennium AD.

City walls 
The Benin City walls have been known to Westerners since around 1500. Around 1500, the Portuguese explorer Duarte Pacheco Pereira, briefly described the walls during his travels. In Pereira's Esmeraldo de Situ Orbis, 1505, we read:

Another description given around 1600, one hundred years after Pereira's description, is by the Dutch explorer Dierick Ruiters.

Pereira's account of the walls is as follows:

The archaeologist Graham Connah suggests that Pereira was probably mistaken with his description by saying that there was no wall. Connah says, "[Pereira] considered that a bank of earth was not a wall in the sense of the Europe of his day."

Ruiters' account of the walls is as follows:

Estimates for the initial construction of the walls range from the first millennium to the mid-fifteenth century.  According to Connah, oral tradition and travelers' accounts suggest a construction date of 1450–1500. It has been estimated that, assuming a ten-hour work day, a labour force of 5,000 men could have completed the walls within 97 days, or by 2,421 men in 200 days. However, these estimates have been criticized for not taking into account the time it would have taken to extract earth from an ever deepening hole and the time it would have taken to heap the earth into a high bank. It is unknown whether slavery or some other type of labour was used in the construction of the walls.

The walls were built of a ditch and dike structure; the ditch dug to form an inner moat with the excavated earth used to form the exterior rampart.

The Benin Walls were partially demolished by the British in 1897 during their 1897 punitive expedition. Scattered pieces of the structure remain in Edo, with the vast majority of them being used by the locals for building purposes. What remains of the wall itself continues to be torn down for real estate developments in Nigeria.
Fred Pearce wrote in New Scientist:

Ethnomathematician Ron Eglash has discussed the planned layout of the city using fractals as the basis, not only in the city itself and the villages but even in the rooms of houses. He commented that "When Europeans first came to Africa, they considered the architecture very disorganised and thus primitive. It never occurred to them that the Africans might have been using a form of mathematics that they hadn’t even discovered yet."

Military
Military operations relied on a well trained disciplined force. At the head of the host stood the Oba of Benin. The monarch of the realm served as supreme military commander. Beneath him were subordinate generalissimos, the Ezomo, the Iyase, and others who supervised a Metropolitan Regiment based in the capital, and a Royal Regiment made up of hand-picked warriors that also served as bodyguards. Benin's queen mother, the Iyoba, also retained her own regiment – the "Queen's Own". The Metropolitan and Royal regiments were relatively stable semi-permanent or permanent formations. The Village Regiments provided the bulk of the fighting force and were mobilized as needed, sending contingents of warriors upon the command of the king and his generals. Formations were broken down into sub-units under designated commanders. Foreign observers often commented favorably on Benin's discipline and organization as "better disciplined than any other Guinea nation", contrasting them with the slacker troops from the Gold Coast.

Until the introduction of guns in the 15th century, traditional weapons like the spear, short sword, and bow held sway. Efforts were made to reorganize a local guild of blacksmiths in the 18th century to manufacture light firearms, but dependence on imports was still heavy. Before the coming of the gun, guilds of blacksmiths were charged with war production—particularly swords and iron spearheads. In addition, crossbowmen formed a specialized unit of the Benin army. Archers and crossbowmen were trained in target and field archery. In 1514 or 1516, the Oba of Benin seized a Portuguese bombard for use.

Benin's tactics were well organized, with preliminary plans weighed by the Oba and his sub-commanders. Logistics were organized to support missions from the usual porter forces, water transport via canoe, and requisitioning from localities the army passed through. Movement of troops via canoes was critically important in the lagoons, creeks and rivers of the Niger Delta, a key area of Benin's domination. Tactics in the field seem to have evolved over time. While the head-on clash was well known, documentation from the 18th century shows greater emphasis on avoiding continuous battle lines, and more effort to encircle an enemy (ifianyako).

Fortifications were important in the region and numerous military campaigns fought by Benin's soldiers revolved around sieges. Benin's military earthworks are the largest of such structures in the world, and Benin's rivals also built extensively. Barring a successful assault, most sieges were resolved by a strategy of attrition, slowly cutting off and starving out the enemy fortification until it capitulated. On occasion, however, European mercenaries were called on to aid with these sieges. In 1603–04 for example, European cannon helped batter and destroy the gates of a town near present-day Lagos, allowing 10,000 warriors of Benin to enter and conquer it. As payment, the Europeans received items, such as palm oil and bundles of pepper. The example of Benin shows the power of indigenous military systems, but also the role outside influences and new technologies brought to bear. This is a normal pattern among many nations.

European contact 
The first European travelers to reach Benin were Portuguese explorers under João Afonso de Aveiro in about 1485. A strong mercantile relationship developed, with the Edo trading slaves and tropical products such as ivory, pepper and palm oil for European goods such as manillas and guns. In the early 16th century, the Oba sent an ambassador to Lisbon, and the king of Portugal sent Christian missionaries to Benin City. Some residents of Benin City could still speak a pidgin Portuguese in the late 19th century.

The first English expedition to Benin was in 1553, and significant trading developed between Europe and Benin based on the export of ivory, palm oil, pepper, and later slaves. Visitors in the 16th and 19th centuries brought back to Europe tales of "Great Benin", a fabulous city of noble buildings, ruled over by a powerful king. A fanciful engraving of the settlement was made by a Dutch illustrator (from descriptions alone) and was shown in Olfert Dapper's Naukeurige Beschrijvinge der Afrikaensche Gewesten, published in Amsterdam in 1668. The work states the following about the royal palace:

Another Dutch traveler, David van Nyendael, visited Benin in 1699 and also wrote an account of the kingdom. Nyendael's description was published in 1704 as an appendix to Willem Bosman's Nauwkeurige Beschryving van de Guinese Goud-, tand- en Slave-kust. In his description, Nyendael states the following about the character of the Benin people:

British trader James Pinnock who visited the kingdom wrote that he saw "a large number of men all handcuffed and chained" with "their ears cut off with a razor". T. B. Auchterlonie described the approach to the capital through an avenue of trees hung with decomposing human remains. After the "lane of horrors" came a grass common "thickly strewn with the skulls and bones of sacrificed human beings".

See also
Art of the Kingdom of Benin
Edo people
Edo language
Festac Town
Flag of the Kingdom of Benin
History of Nigeria
Iyoba of Benin
Oba of Benin
Walls of Benin

References

Sources

 European traders in Benin to Major Copland Crawford. Reporting the stoppage of trade by the Benin King 1896 Apr 13, Catalogue of the Correspondence and Papers of the Niger Coast Protectorate, 268 3/3/3, p. 240. National Archives of Nigeria Enugu.
 Sir Ralph Moore to Foreign Office. Reporting on the abortive Expedition into Benin. 1895 Sept.12 Catalogue of the Correspondence and Papers of the Niger Coast Protectorate, 268 3/3/3, p. 240. National Archives of Nigeria Enugu
 J.R. Phillips to Foreign Office. Advising the deposition of the Benin King. 17 Nov 1896. Despatches to Foreign Office from Consul-General, Catalogue of the Correspondence and Papers of the Niger Coast Protectorate, 268 3/3/3, p. 240. National Archives of Nigeria Enugu.
 Akenzua, Edun (2000). "The Case of Benin". Appendices to the Minutes of Evidence, Appendix 21, House of Commons, The United Kingdom Parliament, March 2000.
 Ben-Amos, Paula Girshick (1999). Art, Innovation, and Politics in Eighteenth-Century Benin. Indiana University Press, 1999. 

*

Further reading

Jones, Adam (1998): Olfert Dapper’s Description of Benin (1668). Madison: University of Madison.
 

Spahr, Thorsten (2006): Benin um 1700. Kommentierte deutsche Neu-Übersetzung eines Briefes von David van Nyendael an Willem Bosman über das Königreich Benin nebst einer Synopsis des im Holländischen zuerst 1704 verlegten Originals und der zeitgenössischen Übersetzungen ins Englische (1705) sowie ins Deutsche (1708). Mammendorf: Pro-Literatur-Verlag.
Spahr, Thorsten (2006): Benin Bibliography. Mammendorf: Pro-Literatur-Verlag.

External links

 Edo at Genealogical Gleanings
 The Benin Moat Foundation
 The Story of Africa: Ife and Benin — BBC World Service
 The origin of Edos/Binis {source Edoworld}
 THE MILITARY SYSTEM OF BENIN KINGDOM, c. 1440–1897
 Nimmons, Fidelia (2012) Kingdom of Benin Blogs: Fiction, Myths and Lies
 The Metropolitan Museum of Art – Idia: The First Queen Mother of Benin

 
Archaeological sites in Nigeria
Prehistoric Africa
World Heritage Sites in Nigeria
Historic buildings and structures in Nigeria
Linear earthworks
Edo people
Former monarchies of Africa
History of Nigeria
Countries in precolonial Africa
Nigerian traditional states
French West Africa
Countries in medieval Africa
12th century in Nigeria
13th century in Nigeria
14th century in Nigeria
15th century in Nigeria
16th century in Nigeria
17th century in Nigeria
18th century in Nigeria
19th century in Nigeria
States and territories established in 1180
States and territories disestablished in 1897
1180s establishments
1897 disestablishments in Africa
12th-century establishments in Nigeria
1890s disestablishments in Nigeria